Les Fonts is a railway station of the Ferrocarrils de la Generalitat de Catalunya (FGC) train system in Les Fonts, Vallès Occidental in the province of Barcelona, Catalonia, Spain. It is served by FGC line S1. The station is in fare zone 2C.

The station was opened in 1920.

References

Stations on the Barcelona–Vallès Line
Railway stations in Vallès Occidental
Railway stations in Spain opened in 1985
1985 establishments in Spain
Railway stations in Spain opened in 1920